Competitive debate, also known as forensics or speech and debate, has a history in the United States dating back to colonial times. The practice, an import from British education, began as in-class exercises in which students would present arguments to their classmates about the nature of rhetoric. Over time, the nature of those conversations began to shift towards philosophical questions and current events, with Yale University being the first to allow students to defend any position on a topic they believed in. In the late nineteenth century, student-led literary societies began to compete with each other academically and often engaged in debates against each other. In 1906, the first intercollegiate debate league, Delta Sigma Rho, was formed, followed by several others. Competitive debate expanded to the secondary school level in 1920 with the founding of the National Speech and Debate Association, which grew to over 300,000 members by 1969. Technological advances such as the accessibility of personal computers in the 1990s and 2000s has led to debate cases becoming more complex and to evidence being more accessible. 

There are a wide variety of competitive debate formats, including the 2v2 Public forum debate, the 1v1 Lincoln–Douglas format, and the 2v2v2v2 British Parliamentary. Regardless of format, most debate rounds use a set topic and have two sides, with one team supporting the topic and the other team opposing the topic. Teams work through a series of speeches presenting their cases, responding to their opponent's arguments, and defending their case. Participation in competitive debate has been associated with positive outcomes for competitors across a wide variety of metrics, including standardized test scores, civic engagement, and future career outcomes, but has been criticized for forcing participants to defend positions they may not agree with and for its inaccessibility to laypeople at its highest levels. Notable former debaters include U.S. senator Ted Cruz and Supreme Court Justice Ketanji Brown Jackson.

History

Debate as an in-class teaching tool: 1642–1892 
Competitive debate in the United States can be traced back to colonial times. As the earliest colleges in America were modeled after British universities, they adopted in-class debates as a pedagogical tool. Initially, these took the form of "syllogistic disputations," highly-structured conversations in Latin which were expected to follow the strict rules of logic. These conversations often focused on the nature of public speaking itself, rather than broader social issues. Students quickly took a dislike to the conversations, with one student at Harvard University describing them as "packs of profound nonsense." Benjamin Wadsworth attempted to continue the practice after becoming president of the University in 1925, but encountered enough difficulty getting students to cooperate with the exercises that within ten years the number of required disputations had been cut in half. The last recorded syllogistic disputation at any university was held at Brown University in 1809.

This early form of debate was replaced by "forensic disputations," which were first introduced at Yale University in 1747. In 1750, Yale's President Clap introduced debates in English alongside the old method of syllogistic disputations in Latin, which earned the approval of Benjamin Franklin. The structure of forensic disputations was looser and allowed for more natural conversations. Students were not assigned sides, rather, they were allowed to contemplate the topic and defend whichever side they believed in. While a student at Harvard, John Quincy Adams regularly participated in forensic disputations, noting in a 1786 letter to his mother that "It comes in course for me to affirm...Whatever the question may be, I must support it." Unlike syllogistic disputations, the topics for forensic disputations often veered towards the hot-button issues of the time: A list of topics debated at Yale in 1832 included questions relating to Native American civil rights, universal suffrage, and capital punishment. Despite their similarity to modern forms of debate, forensic disputations eventually fell out of fashion as well, with student discontent again being a factor. The disputations relied on heavily researched and pre-written cases on each side, but by 1843 most American universities were stressing extemporaneous and oral debate.

Around the time of the forensic disputation's decline, university literary societies began gaining prominence. Institutions would often have multiple student-led societies, each of which would compete with the other academically. Students preferred debating within the societies instead of classrooms as it gave them more control over topic selection and the structure of the round. By the 1890s, literary societies had created standardized structures for debate rounds consisting of prepared cases and extemporaneous rebuttals in a close approximation of modern-day practices. Such societies saw substantial decline during the American Civil War, with the few remaining becoming full-fledged debating societies, teams, and clubs.

Development of intercollegiate debate: 1892–1925 
In 1873, a group of public speaking enthusiasts at Knox College organized the first intercollegiate public speaking organization, known as the Interstate Oratorical Association, which held a yearly competition. The group quickly grew to include chapters in fourteen states and was followed by several other leagues in other regions of the country. The first, informal, intercollegiate debate was held between Harvard and Yale in 1892 and was followed by similar contests on the West Coast and in the Midwest.

From 1906 to 1911, a flurry of intercollegiate debate activity led to the establishment of four different honor societies, or leagues, for debate. Those organizations were Delta Sigma Rho, Tau Kappa Alpha, Phi Alpha Tau, and Pi Kappa Delta. Delta Sigma Rho was founded by a conglomerate of state universities in Chicago in 1906 and quickly became known as the honor society for large universities and Ivy League institutions. Columbia, Harvard, Princeton, and Yale were all members.Tau Kappa Alpha, founded in 1908 by a committee of students from various Indiana institutions, established a system where each state could only have one chapter. Because of this, it became highly selective with its membership. Phi Alpha Tau, which was founded sometime between 1908 and 1911, allowed debaters and non-debaters alike to join, provided they could show an interest in rhetoric. Delta Sigma Rho and Tau Kappa Alpha would eventually merge in 1963, while Phi Alpha Tau is now a fraternity at Emerson College.

In 1911, Pi Kappa Delta was founded at Ottawa University by John A. Shields and Edgar A. Vaughn. Shields, an undergraduate at the university, had been corresponding with Egbert R. Nichols, a former professor at Ottawa who had recently moved to Ripon College. Upon learning that there was not a nationwide debate league that recognized competitors from smaller colleges, Nichols suggested that students from both institutions form their own league. Shields collaborated with Vaughn, a student at Kansas Agricultural College, to lobby other Kansas debate teams to join their newfound institution. Concurrently, Nichols promoted the organization to fellow professors in Illinois, Missouri, Nebraska, and Iowa. Students at Ripon College wrote a charter for the organization, which was signed in January 1913 after several rounds of revisions. In the first two years of the organization, it granted 14 institutional memberships and hundreds of individual memberships across seven states.

Advent of high school debate: 1925–1970 

Competitive debating stayed a primarily intercollegiate activity until 1925 when Bruno E. Jacob founded the National Forensic League (NFL), since been renamed to the National Speech and Debate Association (NSDA). A professor at Ripon College, Jacob was inspired by a letter he received asking if a debate league for high school students existed. Upon learning that there was no nationwide league, Jacob established the NFL on March 28, 1925, and within a year the league had 100 member schools around the country. While some high school organizations like North Carolina's High School Debating Union and the Montana State High-School Debate League existed, they only allowed students to compete up to the state level. In 1937, the NFL established a "National Student Congress," a debate event in which students roleplay as members of the United States Congress. During World War II the NFL suspended all operations except for Congressional debate, receiving a letter of commendation from President Franklin Delano Roosevelt. In 1950 Jacob resigned from his teaching post to devote himself to the NFL on a full-time basis. By the time of his resignation in 1969, the league had grown to over 300,000 student members.

In 1963, U.S. Senator B. Everett Jordan introduced a bill to require the Librarian of Congress to prepare a report on the Policy debate topics at the high school and intercollegiate level each year. This bill was eventually adopted into law, with annual reports published to this day.

Rise of "progressive" debate: 1970–present 
The activity of debate continued to grow, eventually becoming large enough to not require invited judges, such as policy experts or professors of rhetoric. By the mid-1970s, tournaments were often judged by former or current competitors. In 1972, the Tournament of Champions was founded by J.W. Patterson, director of debate at the University of Kentucky. This event, which would go on to become the most prestigious national tournament for high school students, was specifically designed as a tournament without inexperienced judges. With these developments, team strategy began to move away from a "public model" geared at a general audience and towards a "policy-making" model. Allan Louden, tracing these developments at the National Debate Tournament, noted that "as speed rapidly increased...debate became more analytical, geared to expert audiences." In the 1980s or the early 1990s, a new argument called a "kritik" was introduced to intercollegiate debate. Kritiks are a unique type of argument that argue "that there is a harm created by the assumption created or used by the other side" – that is, there is some other issue that must be addressed before the topic can be debated. Early pioneers of the kritik used them primarily as a supplement to other arguments rather than as stand-alone cases. Kritiks faced criticism from traditional debaters and judges because they did not require competitors to directly debate the assigned topic. Nevertheless, they took hold and remain a stable of intercollegiate and high school debate today. Most recently, some debaters have advanced an argumentation style known as "performance debate" which emphasizes "identity, narrative understandings, and confrontation of life's disparities." This argumentation style, advanced predominantly by Black debaters, has been used by debaters to discuss issues related to identity and difference.
As debate techniques continued to become more progressive, new debate leagues were formed to accommodate different styles. In 1971, the Cross Examination Debate Association (CEDA) was established. Jack Howe, the first president of CEDA, described the association as being "a reaction against a prevailing style of debate that both participants and their directors found increasingly difficult to support. CEDA prioritized an "audience-oriented" form of debate which required strong presentation skills along with evidence. It grew quickly, becoming the largest intercollegiate debate league by 1990. In 1985, the American Debate Association was founded, also as a reaction to new debate techniques. Seeking to revitalize intercollegiate policy debate, the American Debate Association set clear rules for both competitors and judges: Among the rules were a ban on kritiks, a limit on speech speed, and a restriction on judge's ability to read evidence after round.
As technology advanced throughout the late 1990s and early 2000s, debaters consistently adopted newer techniques to incorporate technological developments. For much of the 1900s, debaters cataloged different pieces of evidence on "cards," which were photocopied sections of newspaper articles and books pasted to index cards. For policy debaters, who debated the same topic for an entire year, the number of cards could quickly become overwhelming, sometimes requiring 100,000 pieces of paper and 50 boxes of cards per team. As internet research became more accessible, teams began moving to entirely paperless debate, storing research on Word documents. In 2008 the Whitman College debate team, led by Jim Hanson, became the first college-level team to go entirely digital, leading them to be described as "the greenest in the country." As cases moved to electronic formats, debaters began posting their work in publicly available wikis to make research more accessible to debaters from smaller schools. These "caselist wikis" have been described by G. Thomas Goodnight and Gordon Mitchell as creating "intricate and detailed map[s]" of various controversies falling under debate topics and as being a valuable resource for a slate of non-debate professions as well, including legislators, journalists, and policy analysts.

Structure of competitive debate 

In the United States, there are a wide variety of debate formats and leagues to support them. At the high school level, the predominant league is the National Speech and Debate Association, which offers seven debate events and eighteen speaking events. Other high school leagues, such as the National Catholic Forensic League, National Christian Forensics and Communications Association, and Stoa USA, offer similar events. Intercollegiate leagues vary, but generally only offer a single style of debate.

The basic structure of most debate rounds, regardless of the specific format, is as follows: A topic is presented to the teams, who either choose a side of the topic or are assigned one. The "affirmative" or "aff" defends the topic and the "negation" or "neg" opposes it. Throughout a round, each team has the opportunity to present a case, respond to their opponent's case, defend their case, and ask questions of their opponent. At the end of a round, the judge evaluates the arguments and determines the winner, awarding "speaker points" to both debaters to grade their presentation separately from their argumentation.

Formats 

 Policy debate is a 2v2 style of debate and the oldest format still regularly practiced in the United States. It features a year-round topic which tends to be vague, requiring affirmative debaters to present a detailed plan explaining how they would implement the topic. Because there are a substantial number of plans the affirmative could run, policy debate requires substantially more research than other topics.
 Lincoln-Douglas debate is a 1v1 style of debate based on the structure of the Lincoln–Douglas debates of 1858. Lincoln-Douglas topics change every two months and are typically statements of value that require the sides to discuss the merits of different philosophical schools of thought.
 Public forum debate is a 2v2 style of debate with topics that change every month. The event was developed by Ted Turner, the founder of CNN, specifically so that there could be an event focused on being accessible to laypeople. Public Forum debates tend to focus on current events issues and require debaters to defend either the status quo or a specified change to the status quo.
 Big Questions is a 1v1, 2v1, or 2v2 style of debate with a year-round topic related to morality, religion, and science. The event was created by the John Templeton Foundation and competitors have previously debated topics such as "Science leaves no room for free will" and "Objective morality exists."
 Congressional Debate is a simulation of government proceedings with many debaters in a room together roleplaying as legislators. Students typically begin by electing one member to serve as the "Presiding Officer," equivalent to the position of Speaker of the United States House of Representatives, who sets an order of bills. Competitors generally use a packet of bills submitted by schools across their competition area that were written by students.
 World Schools Debate is a 3v3 style of debate with a topic that changes every round. Tournaments typically consist of multiple impromptu and prepared rounds. In impromptu rounds, teams have some time between the topic announcement and the round beginning to prepare cases. In prepared rounds, the topic is generally announced before the beginning of the tournament so that teams can write cases beforehand.
 British Parliamentary is a 2v2v2v2 style where four teams, two on each side of the topic, debate each other. Each round is impromptu with the topic announced shortly before the beginning of the round. Despite there being two teams on each side of the topic, the teams are ranked out of four and may not collaborate with each other.

Competitor outcomes 
Participation in competitive debate is associated with positive outcomes for competitors. Advocates for debate education, such as former United States Secretary of Education Arne Duncan, cite debate education as being "uniquely suited" to developing "critical thinking, communication, collaboration, and creativity." Former competitors generally describe their time as competitive debaters positively, describing it as leading to broadened worldviews and a more well-rounded education.

At the high school level, debate competitors outscore non-debate competitors on standardized tests and have higher Grade Point Averages (GPAs). One study found that competitors in the Chicago Urban debate league (UDL) were more likely to graduate high school, scored an additional point higher on all portions of the ACT, and had significantly higher GPAs. Another study, also focused on the Chicago UDL, found that "debaters report greater social, civic, and social engagement than non-debaters." A study of Colorado students found a small yet statistically significant relationship between debate participation and higher standardized test scores. This effect has been especially noted among at-risk and African American students. Briana Mezuk found in a 2009 study that African American male students who participated in debate were more likely to graduate and have stronger reading comprehension than their peers who did not participate in debate.

Similar results have been observed among intercollegiate competitors. A two-decade cohort study by Rogers, Freeman, and Rennels recorded competitors' civic engagement, career trajectory, and continued education. Intercollegiate competitors were more likely to vote, volunteer, have diverse friend groups, and have healthier personality profiles. They were also more likely to receive pay raises and promotions.

Controversies

Discrimination within the community 
Multiple studies have noted that female debaters tend to underperform male debaters, a disparity has noted at both the high school and intercollegiate levels. One study, comparing 125,087 high school debate rounds across two different seasons, found that female-female teams were 17.1% less likely to win and male-female teams were 10% less likely to win when competing against a male-male team. Female debaters were also found to be 30.34% more likely to quit the activity. This disparity can be at least partially attributed to the subjective nature of a debate round, with a 2022 qualitative study of high school debate competitors finding that the "norms surrounding what it means to be a 'good' debater" often played into gender biases.

Criticisms of debate 
The basic format of competitive debate, in which competitors are required to research both sides of a topic, has faced criticism. In 1954, amid the Cold War, a group of colleges refused to debate the topic "The United States should diplomatically recognize the People's Republic of China" because doing so would require them to argue against the current U.S. policy. In the wake of this controversy, Richard Murphy, a professor of speech at the University of Illinois, published a series of articles criticizing the practice of debating both sides of a topic. He argued that debate, as a form of public speaking, required debaters to publicly commit to their positions within a debate round. Quoting Brooks Quimby, a prolific debate coach at Bates College, Murphy claimed that debaters needed to be "men and women of principle" rather than "men and women trained to take either side at the flip of a coin." In 1964, a survey of debate coaches across the country found that 95% believed debating both sides of a topic to be ethical, and the authors declared the controversy to be "pau," or finished.

Other criticisms of the format of debate have been presented. Jonathan Ellis wrote in The New York Times that competitive debate promotes biased reasoning by giving debaters a specific view to work backward from rather than allowing them to come to their own unique position on a topic. James Dimock, a debate coach at Minnesota State University, presented two objections to competitive debate in a 2009 paper: First, as debate topics have grown more complex debaters are incentivized to be concise over complete in their analyses, and second, debaters are often rewarded for making arguments from authority rather than logically sound arguments. Neal Katyal has responded to some criticisms of debate by arguing that taking a position in a debate round, which exists to interrogate arguments, is different from advocating a position in a public square. He furthered that debate topics tend to avoid forcing debaters into advocating for positions widely considered ethically indefensible.

Spreading, the practice of reading arguments at speeds incomprehensible to a layperson, has faced criticism for creating an environment where the team that can read more arguments wins, regardless of persuasiveness. Former national champion debater and U.S. Senator Ted Cruz described it as "a pernicious disease that has undermined the very essence of high school and college debate." Defenders of the practice, such as Justin Eckstein, claim that it prioritizes critical thinking and research and that debaters will inevitably prioritize speed to read more arguments.

Notable former competitors 

 Samuel Alito, high school debater and Associate Justice of the U.S. Supreme Court
 William Lane Craig, high school debater and Christian apologist.
 Ted Cruz, collegiate debater at Princeton University and U.S. senator
 James Farmer, collegiate debater at Wiley College and civil rights activist.
 Ketanji Brown Jackson, high school debater at Miami Palmetto Senior High School and Associate Justice of the U.S. Supreme Court
 Carlos Maza, high school debater at Christopher Columbus High School and journalist.
 Bo Seo, collegiate debater at Harvard University and journalist.
 Sonia Sotomayor, high school debater and Associate Justice of the U.S. Supreme Court
 Elizabeth Warren, high school debater at Northwest Classen High School and U.S. Senator

In popular culture 

 The 1989 drama film Listen to Me is about a collegiate debate team who receive the opportunity to argue in front of the Supreme Court of the United States. 
 The 2006 book Cross-X by Joe Miller follows the Kansas City Central High School debate team through the 2002 season, culminating in the national tournament. 
 The 2007 biographical film The Great Debaters is about the Wiley College debate team coached by Melvin B. Tolson.
 The 2017 film Speech & Debate is about a group of high school students trying to revive their debate team.
 The 2018 romantic comedy Candy Jar is about two rival high school debaters competing for college scholarships.

References 

Debating
Education in the United States
University and college sports
Debating competitions